Sîngerei is a district in the north of Moldova, with the administrative center at Sîngerei.
The other major city is Biruința. As of 1 January 2011, its population was 93,400.

Between 1944 and 1991, Sîngerei district was called Lazovsky District.

History
Localities with the earliest documentary attestation are Coşcodeni, Drăgăneşti, Tăura Veche, these being attested for the first time during 1508–1536. District administrative center Sîngerei is first documented on 17 May 1586. In the following centuries there is a development of trade, culture and an important increase in population. In 1812 the Treaty of Bucharest, Basarabia is occupied by the Russian Empire for a period of a century (1812–1917). After the collapse of the Russian Empire in 1917, in 1918 Basarabia decide union with the motherland Romania, so the region today forming part of the Bălți County (1918–1944). Is again occupied Basarabia in 1940 after the Molotov-Ribbentrop Treaty, this time the USSR. The territorial-administrative, certified as the district Lazovsky District (Sîngerei), was established on 11 November 1940 following a decision by the Supreme Soviet of the Moldavian SSR, a few months after Russian troops entered the area between the Prut and Nistru. Initially, the entering only a part of current locations, the other belonging Chișcăreni district, which later merged Singerei district. In 1991 as a result of the proclamation of Independence of Moldova, part of the Bălți County (1991–2003), and in 2003 became administrative unit of Moldova.

Geography
Singerei district is located in the north of Moldova has neighborhood the Drochia District in north, east Floreşti District, Ungheni District in the southwest district, Teleneşti District south, west Făleşti District and Bălți municipality in northwest. Geographically, it situated in Balti steppe and is a hilly plain. Erosion process with low intensity. Maximum altitude between 190–240 meters in district.

Climate
District has a temperate-continental climate with an increase in summer (21.0–21.5 °C) and winter (−4.5–5.0 °C). 450–550 mm annual amount of precipitation. Average wind speed 3–5 m/s.

Fauna
Mainly steppe fauna is represented by: hare, hedgehog, fox, deer, wild boar, raccoon dog, badger, wolf and red deer. Of birds there are: stork, egrets, quail, heron, steppe eagle, crow, nightingale and others.

Flora
Forests occupy 10.9% of the district and there are: oak, ash, hornbeam, hazel, acacia and other trees. Plants include: fescue, bells, clover, knotweed, mugwort and others.

Rivers
District is located in the Nistru river basin, crosses the river Răut (286 km) the largest tributary of the Nistru, with its tributaries: Soloneţ, Ciulcul de Mijloc, Cubolta (102 km). Most lakes are of natural origin, but are rich in fish.

Administrative subdivisions
Localities: 70
Administrative center: Sîngerei
Cities: Biruința, Sîngerei
Communes: 24
Villages: 44

Demographics

1 January 2012 the district population was 93,200 of which 20.1% urban and 79.9% rural population.

Births (2010): 1134 (12.1 per 1000)
Deaths (2010): 1124 (12.0 per 1000)
Growth rate (2010): 10 (0.1 per 1000)

Ethnic groups 

Footnote: * There is an ongoing controversy regarding the ethnic identification of Moldovans and Romanians.

Religion 
Christians – 98.5%
Orthodox Christians – 90.8%
Protestant – 7.4%
Baptists – 3.4%
Evangelicals – 1.3%
Seventh-day Adventists – 1.3%
Pentecostals – 0.8%
Evangelicals – 0.6%
Catholics – 0.3%
Other – 1.3%
No Religion – 0.2%

Economy
In the district are registered, a total of 6525 companies. The share of agricultural land is 54,981 ha (53.2%) total land area. Arable land occupies 49 757 ha (48.2%) of the total agricultural land, orchards plantations – 2901 ha (2.8%), vineyards occupy 1249 ha (1.2%), pastures – 19,020 ha (18.4%), other – 2658 ha (2.6%). Agriculture is the main branch of economy grow: cereals (wheat, barley, oats), vegetables, tobacco, sunflower, sugar beet, in orchards: apple, plum, pear, cherry and others.

Education
The district Singerei working 53 educational institutions, including schools – 10, secondary schools – 1, gymnasium – 33 primary schools – 6, special schools – one, polyvalent vocational schools – 2.

Politics
Singerei district is a district with a percentage of centre-right party present here AEI usually get positive results, and PCRM are in a continuous fall. During 2001–2009, the district was a predominantly communist (over 50%).

During the last three elections AEI had an increase of 101.9%

Elections

|-
!style="background-color:#E9E9E9" align=center colspan="2" valign=center|Parties and coalitions
!style="background-color:#E9E9E9" align=right|Votes
!style="background-color:#E9E9E9" align=right|%
!style="background-color:#E9E9E9" align=right|+/−
|-
| 
|align=left|Party of Communists of the Republic of Moldova
|align="right"|14,744
|align="right"|38.31
|align="right"|−5.12
|-
| 
|align=left|Liberal Democratic Party of Moldova
|align="right"|11,037
|align="right"|28.68
|align="right"|+11.71
|-
| 
|align=left|Democratic Party of Moldova
|align="right"|7,399
|align="right"|19,23
|align="right"|-0.86
|-
| 
|align=left|Liberal Party
|align="right"|2,071
|align="right"|5.38
|align="right"|−3.98
|-
| 
|align=left|Party Alliance Our Moldova
|align="right"|772
|align="right"|2.01
|align="right"|−4.17
|-
|bgcolor=#0033cc|
|align=left|European Action Movement
|align="right"|772
|align="right"|2.01
|align="right"|+2.01
|-
|bgcolor="grey"|
|align=left|Other Party
|align="right"|1,701
|align="right"|4.38
|align="right"|+0.41
|-
|align=left style="background-color:#E9E9E9" colspan="2"|Total (turnout 57.37%)
|width="30" align="right" style="background-color:#E9E9E9"|38,814
|width="30" align="right" style="background-color:#E9E9E9"|100.00
|width="30" align="right" style="background-color:#E9E9E9"|

Culture
Working in the district Singerei: 180 artistic groups, 21 bands holding the title of the band model, public libraries – 48, houses of culture – 48.

Health
The district Singerei works:
Singerei district hospital with general fund of 280 beds, a center of family doctors in the composition of which are 17 family physician offices, nine health centers, 30 health points.

Personalities
 
 

 Anton Crihan – Lawyer, economist, politician and publicist, in 1949 emigrate to United States
 Ion Hadârcă – Poet, Politic (Liberal Party), Member of Moldavian Parliament between 1990–1998 and 2009–present
 Gheorghe Duca – Scientist, president of the Academy of Sciences of Moldova
 Pan Halippa – Publicist and politician, president of Sfatul Țării, which voted the union in 1918
 Sergei Tigipko – Ukrainian politician, finance specialist, former Vice-Prime Minister of Ukraine and Minister of Economics of Ukraine
 Sergiu Grossu – Writer and theologian
 Vasile Gafencu – Basarabian politician, member of the Sfatul Țării (1917–1918)
 Vitalie Nagacevschi – Lawyer, Member of Parliament of Moldova between 2009–2010

References

 
Districts of Moldova